Colonel Arthur B. Sleigh, also known as Burrowes Willcocks Arthur Sleigh (1821, Montreal – 1869, Chelsea) was a Canadian-born British Army officer, travel writer and the original founder of the British newspaper The Daily Telegraph.

Sleigh founded The Daily Telegraph in 1855 to air a personal grievance against the Prince George, Duke of Cambridge, but its first issue was not a success and Sleigh was soon forced to sell the paper to his publisher, Joseph Moses Levy.

Notes and references

19th-century British newspaper publishers (people)
1821 births
1869 deaths
77th Regiment of Foot officers
British Yeomanry officers